Nardò is a small town and comune in the southern Italian region of Apulia.

Nardo may also refer to:

People
 Nardo di Cione (died c. 1366), Italian painter, sculptor and architect
 Don Nardo (born 1947), American historian, composer and writer
 Giovanni Domenico Nardo (1802–1877), Italian naturalist
 Leonardo Colella (born 1930), Brazilian footballer also known as Nardo

Other uses
 A.C.D. Nardò, an Italian football club based in Nardò, Apulia
 Common Spanish name for the tuberose Agave amica (syn. Polianthes tuberosa)
 Volkswagen Nardo, a concept automobile
 Nardo, a former borough of Trondheim
 Nardo (Martian crater), an impact crater on Mars
 Elaine Nardo, a character on the TV series Taxi
 Nardò Ring, a high speed test track

See also
 DiNardo, a list of people with the surname DiNardo or Di Nardo